A thermal energy battery is a physical structure used for the purpose of storing and releasing thermal energy—see also thermal energy storage.  Such a thermal battery (a.k.a. TBat) allows energy available at one time to be temporarily stored and then released at another time.  The basic principles involved in a thermal battery occur at the atomic level of matter, with energy being added to or taken from either a solid mass or a liquid volume which causes the substance's temperature to change.  Some thermal batteries also involve causing a substance to transition thermally through a phase transition which causes even more energy to be stored and released due to the delta enthalpy of fusion or delta enthalpy of vaporization.

History of thermal batteries 

Thermal batteries are very common, and include such familiar items as a hot water bottle.  Early examples of thermal batteries include stone and mud cook stoves, rocks placed in fires, and kilns.  While stoves and kilns are ovens, they are also thermal storage systems that depend on heat being retained for an extended period of time.

Types of thermal batteries 

Thermal batteries generally fall into 4 categories with different forms and applications, although fundamentally all are for the storage and retrieval of thermal energy.  They also differ in method and density of heat storage.

Phase change thermal battery 

Phase change materials used for thermal storage are capable of storing and releasing significant thermal capacity at the temperature that they change phase.  These materials are chosen based on specific applications because there is a wide range of temperatures that may be useful in different applications and a wide range of materials that change phase at different temperatures.  These materials include salts and waxes that are specifically engineered for the applications they serve.  In addition to manufactured materials, water is a phase change material.  The latent heat of water is 334 joules/gram.  The phase change of water occurs at 0 °C (32 °F).

Some applications use the thermal capacity of water or ice as cold storage; others use it as heat storage.  It can serve either application; ice can be melted to store heat then refrozen to warm an environment which is below freezing (putting liquid water at 0 °C in such an environment warms that environment much more than the same mass of ice at the same temperature, because the latent heat of freezing is extracted from it, which is why the phase change is relevant), or water can be frozen to "store cold" then melted to make an environment above freezing colder (and again, a given mass of ice at 0 °C will provide more cooling than the same mass of water at the same temperature).

The advantage of using a phase change in this way is that a given mass of material can absorb a large quantity of energy without its temperature changing. Hence a thermal battery that uses a phase change can be made lighter, or more energy can be put into it without raising the internal temperature unacceptably.

Encapsulated thermal battery 

An encapsulated thermal battery is physically similar to a phase change thermal battery in that it is a confined amount of physical material which is thermally heated or cooled to store or extract energy.  However, in a non-phase change encapsulated thermal battery, the temperature of the substance is changed without inducing a phase change.  Since a phase change is not needed many more materials are available for use in an encapsulated thermal battery.

One of the key properties of an encapsulated thermal battery is its volumetric heat capacity (VHC), also termed volume-specific heat capacity.  Typical substances used for these thermal batteries include water, concrete, and wet sand.

An example of an encapsulated thermal battery is a residential water heater with a storage tank.  This thermal battery is usually slowly charged over a period of about 30–60 minutes for rapid use when needed (e.g., 10–15 minutes).  Many utilities, understanding the "thermal battery" nature of water heaters, have begun using them to absorb excess renewable energy power when available for later use by the homeowner.  According to the above-cited article, "net savings to the electricity system as a whole could be $200 per year per heater – some of which may be passed on to its owner".

Research into using sand as a heat storage medium has been performed in Finland, where a prototype sand battery has been built to store renewable solar and wind power as heat, for later use as district heating, and possible later power generation.

Unencapsualated thermal batteries

GHEX thermal battery 

A ground heat exchanger (GHEX) is an area of the earth that is utilized as a seasonal/annual cycle thermal battery.  These thermal batteries are areas of the earth into which pipes have been placed in order to transfer thermal energy; they are "unencapsulated" in the sense that the target area is not insulated from the rest of the surrounding earth.  Energy is added to the GHEX by running a higher temperature fluid through the pipes and thus raising the temperature of the local earth.  Energy can also be taken from the GHEX by running a lower-temperature fluid through those same pipes.
	 
GHEX thermal batteries are usually implemented in two forms.  The picture above depicts what is known as a "horizontal" GHEX where trenching is used to place an amount of pipe in a closed loop in the ground.  They are also formed by drilling boreholes into the ground, either vertically or horizontally, and then the pipes are inserted in the form of a closed-loop with a "u-bend" fitting on the far end of the loop.  These drilled GHEX thermal batteries are also sometimes called "borehole thermal energy storage systems".
	 
Heat energy can be added to or removed from a GHEX thermal battery at any point in time.  However, they are most often used as a Seasonal thermal energy storage operating on an annual cycle where energy is extracted from a building during the summer season to cool a building and added to the GHEX. Then that same energy is later extracted from the GHEX in the winter season to heat the building.  This annual cycle of energy addition and subtraction is highly predictable based on energy modelling of the building served.  A thermal battery used in this mode is a renewable energy source as the energy extracted in the winter will be restored to the GHEX the next summer in a continually repeating cycle.  This type is solar powered because it is the heat from the sun in the summer that is removed from a building and stored in the ground for use in the next winter season for heating.  There are two main methods of Thermal Response Testing that are used to characterize the thermal conductivity and Thermal Capacity/Diffusivity of GHEX Thermal Batteries—Log-Time 1-Dimensional Curve Fit and newly released Advanced Thermal Response Testing.

A good example of the Annual Cycle nature of a GHEX Thermal Battery can be seen in the ASHRAE Building study.  As seen there in the 'Ground Loop and Ambient Air temperatures by date' graphic (Figure 2-7), one can easily see the annual cycle sinusoidal shape of the ground temperature as heat is seasonally extracted from the ground in winter and rejected to the ground in summer, creating a ground "thermal charge" in one season that is not uncharged and driven the other direction from neutral until a later season.  Other more advanced examples of Ground-based Thermal Batteries utilizing intentional well-bore thermal patterns are currently in research and early use.

Other thermal batteries

In the defense industry primary molten-salt batteries are termed "thermal batteries". They are non-rechargable electrical batteries using a low-melting eutectic mixture of ionic metal salts (sodium, potassium and lithium chlorides, bromides, etc) as the electrolyte, manufactured with the salts in solid form.  As long as the salts remain solid, the battery has a long shelf life of up to 50 years.  Once activated (usually by a pyrotechnic heat source) and the electrolyte melts, it is very reliable with a high energy and power density.  They are extensively used for military applications such as small to large guided missiles, and nuclear weapons.

There are other items that have historically been termed "thermal batteries", such as energy-storage heat packs that skiers use for keeping hands and feet warm (see hand warmer).  These contain iron powder moist with oxygen-free salt water which rapidly corrodes over a period of hours, releasing heat, when exposed to air.  Instant cold packs absorb heat by a non-chemical phase-change such as by absorbing the endothermic heat of solution of certain compounds. 

The one common principle of these other thermal batteries is that the reaction involved is not reversible.  Thus, these batteries are not used for storing and retrieving heat energy.

See also
 Thermal energy storage
 Seasonal thermal energy storage
 Ground-coupled heat exchanger
 Geothermal heat pump
 International Ground Source Heat Pump Association
 Steam accumulator

References

Energy storage